Nannophlebia mudginberri is a species of dragonfly of the family Libellulidae, 
known as the Top End archtail. 
It inhabits streams of northern Australia.
It is a small dragonfly with black and yellow markings and a slender body.

Gallery

See also
 List of Odonata species of Australia

References

Libellulidae
Odonata of Australia
Insects of Australia
Endemic fauna of Australia
Taxa named by J.A.L. (Tony) Watson
Taxa named by Günther Theischinger
Insects described in 1991